Jack is a novel by Marilynne Robinson, published in September 2020.

It is Robinson's fifth novel overall and her fourth in the Gilead sequence, preceded by Gilead (2004), Home (2008), and Lila (2014). It focuses on John Ames "Jack" Boughton, the troubled son of Robert Boughton. He was named after Robert's friend Reverend John Ames, the subject of Gilead (2004). It tells the story of the courtship of Della Miles and Jack Boughton, an interracial couple in post-World War II St. Louis, Missouri.

Reception
In its starred review, Publishers Weekly praised the novel's dialogue and Robinson's "masterly prose and musings on faith."

In its starred review, Kirkus Reviews called the novel an "elegantly written proof of the thesis that love conquers all—but not without considerable pain."

Writing for The New York Times Book Review, Elaine Showalter praised Jack's dialogue for "winningly" representing his "redemption and development, his sensitivity and sardonic humor."

Ron Charles of The Washington Post criticized the novel's "asymmetrical" focus on Jack for diminishing Della's character.

Claire Lowdon of The Times felt the novel was the weakest in the Gilead series, criticizing its dialogue for being "burdened with too much of the philosophical and theological debate."

Awards and nominations
 Longlist, 2021 Andrew Carnegie Medal for Excellence in Fiction

References

2020 American novels
Novels by Marilynne Robinson
Farrar, Straus and Giroux books
Novels set in St. Louis
Third-person narrative novels